The Threepenny Opera is a "play with music" by Bertolt Brecht, adapted from a translation by Elisabeth Hauptmann of John Gay's 18th-century English ballad opera, The Beggar's Opera, and four ballads by François Villon, with music by Kurt Weill. Although there is debate as to how much, if any, contribution Hauptmann might have made to the text, Brecht is usually listed as sole author.

The work offers a socialist critique of the capitalist world. It opened on 31 August 1928 at Berlin's Theater am Schiffbauerdamm.

Songs from The Threepenny Opera have been widely covered and become standards, most notably "" ("The Ballad of Mack the Knife") and "" ("Pirate Jenny").

Background

Origins 
In the winter of 1927–28, Elizabeth Hauptmann, Brecht's lover at the time, received a copy of Gay's play from friends in England and, fascinated by the female characters and its critique of the condition of the London poor, began translating it into German. Brecht at first took little interest in her translation project, but in April 1928 he attempted to interest the impresario  in a play he was writing called Fleischhacker, which he had, in fact, already promised to another producer. Aufricht was seeking a production to launch his new theatre company at the Theater am Schiffbauerdamm in Berlin, but was not impressed by the sound of Fleischhacker. Brecht immediately proposed a translation of The Beggar's Opera instead, claiming that he himself had been translating it. He delivered Hauptmann's translation to Aufricht, who immediately signed a contract for it.

Brecht's major addition to Hauptmann's text was the addition of four songs by the French poet François Villon.

The first act of both works begins with the same melody ("Peachum's Morning Chorale"/"An Old Woman Clothed In Gray"), but that is the only material Weill borrowed from the melodies Johann Christoph Pepusch arranged for The Beggar's Opera. The title Die Dreigroschenoper was determined only a week before the opening; it had been previously announced as simply The Beggar's Opera (in English), with the subtitle "Die Luden-Oper" ("The Pimp's Opera").

Writing in 1929, Weill made the political and artistic intents of the work clear:With the Dreigroschenoper we reach a public which either did not know us at all or thought us incapable of captivating listeners [...] Opera was founded as an aristocratic form of art [...] If the framework of opera is unable to withstand the impact of the age, then this framework must be destroyed....In the Dreigroschenoper, reconstruction was possible insofar as here we had a chance of starting from scratch.  Weill claimed at the time that "music cannot further the action of the play or create its background", but achieves its proper value when it interrupts the action at the right moments."

Music 
Weill's score shows the influence of jazz and German dance music of the time. The orchestration involves a small ensemble with a good deal of doubling-up on instruments (in the original performances, for example, some 7 players covered a total of 23 instrumental parts, though modern performances typically use a few more players).

Premieres

Germany 
The Threepenny Opera was first performed at the Theater am Schiffbauerdamm in 1928 on a set designed by Caspar Neher. Despite an initially poor reception, it became a great success, playing 400 times in the next two years. The performance was a springboard for one of the best known interpreters of Brecht and Weill's work, Lotte Lenya, who was married to Weill. Ironically the production became a great favourite of Berlin's "smart set" – Count Harry Kessler recorded in his diary meeting at the performance an ambassador and a director of the Dresdner Bank (and their wives), and concluded "One simply has to have been there."

Critics did not fail to notice that Brecht had included the four Villon songs translated by Ammer. Brecht responded by saying that he had "a fundamental laxity in questions of literary property."

By 1933, when Weill and Brecht were forced to leave Germany by the Nazi seizure of power, the play had been translated into 18 languages and performed more than 10,000 times on European stages.

United Kingdom 
In the United Kingdom, the first fully staged performance was given on 9 February 1956, under Berthold Goldschmidt, although there had been a concert performance in 1933, and a semi-staged performance on 28 July 1938. In between, on 8 February 1935 Edward Clark conducted the first British broadcast of the work. It received scathing reviews from Ernest Newman and other critics. But the most savage criticism came from Weill himself, who described it privately as "the worst performance imaginable … the whole thing was completely misunderstood". But his criticisms seem to have been for the concept of the piece as a Germanised version of The Beggar's Opera, rather than for Clark's conducting of it, of which Weill made no mention.

United States 
America was introduced to the work by the film version of G. W. Pabst, which opened in New York in 1931.

The first American production, adapted into English by Gifford Cochran and Jerrold Krimsky and staged by Francesco von Mendelssohn, featured Robert Chisholm as Macheath. It opened on Broadway at the Empire Theatre, on April 13, 1933, and closed after 12 performances. Mixed reviews praised the music but slammed the production, with the critic Gilbert Gabriel calling it "a dreary enigma".

France 
A French version produced by Gaston Baty and written by Ninon Steinhof and André Mauprey was presented in October 1930 at the Théâtre Montparnasse in Paris.

Russia 
In 1930 the work was premiered in Moscow at the Kamerny Theatre, directed by Alexander Tairov. It was the only one of Brecht's works to be performed in Russia during his lifetime. Izvestia disapproved: "It is high time that our theatres ceased playing homage to petit-bourgeois bad taste and instead turned to more relevant themes."

Italy 
The first Italian production, titled L'opera da tre soldi and directed by Giorgio Strehler, premiered at the Piccolo Teatro in Milan on 27 February 1956 in the presence of Bertolt Brecht. The cast included: Tino Carraro (Mackie), Mario Carotenuto (Peachum),  (Polly), Milly (Jenny),  (Chief of Police). The conductor was Bruno Maderna. Set designs were by Luciano Damiani and Teo Otto; costume design by Ezio Frigerio.

Hungary 
The first Hungarian performance of the play was at the Comedy Theatre of Budapest (Vígszínház), on 6 September 1930. It was titled A koldus operája, which is a reference to Gay's original opera. The play was translated by Jenő Heltai, who mixed Weill and Pepusch' s music, and also Brecht and Gay's texts too. The director was Ernő Szabolcs, the cast included: Pál Jávor (Mackie), Franciska Gaal (Polly), Gerő Mály (Peachum), Ella Gombaszögi (Mrs. Peachum).

Roles

Synopsis

Overview 
Set in Victorian London, the play focuses on Macheath, an amoral, antiheroic criminal.

Macheath ("Mackie," or "Mack the Knife") marries Polly Peachum. This displeases her father, who controls the beggars of London, and he endeavours to have Macheath hanged. His attempts are hindered by the fact that the Chief of Police, Tiger Brown, is Macheath's old army comrade. Still, Peachum exerts his influence and eventually gets Macheath arrested and sentenced to hang. Macheath escapes this fate via a deus ex machina moments before the execution when, in an unrestrained parody of a happy ending, a messenger from the Queen arrives to pardon Macheath and grant him the title of baron. The details of the original 1928 text have often been substantially modified in later productions.

A draft narration by Brecht for a concert performance begins: "You are about to hear an opera for beggars. Since this opera was intended to be as splendid as only beggars can imagine, and yet cheap enough for beggars to be able to watch, it is called the Threepenny Opera."

Prologue 
A street singer entertains the crowd with the illustrated murder ballad or Bänkelsang, titled "Die Moritat von Mackie Messer" ("Ballad of Mack the Knife"). As the song concludes, a well-dressed man leaves the crowd and crosses the stage. This is Macheath, alias "Mack the Knife".

Act 1 
The story begins in the shop of Jonathan Jeremiah Peachum, the boss of London's beggars, who outfits and trains the beggars in return for a slice of their takings from begging. In the first scene, the extent of Peachum's iniquity is immediately exposed. Filch, a new beggar, is obliged to bribe his way into the profession and agree to pay over to Peachum 50 percent of whatever he made; the previous day he had been severely beaten up for begging within the area of jurisdiction of Peachum's protection racket.

After finishing with the new man, Peachum becomes aware that his grown daughter Polly did not return home the previous night. Peachum, who sees his daughter as his own private property, concludes that she has become involved with Macheath. This does not suit Peachum at all, and he becomes determined to thwart this relationship and destroy Macheath.

The scene shifts to an empty stable where Macheath himself is preparing to marry Polly once his gang has stolen and brought all the necessary food and furnishings. No vows are exchanged, but Polly is satisfied, and everyone sits down to a banquet. Since none of the gang members can provide fitting entertainment, Polly gets up and sings "Seeräuberjenny", a revenge fantasy in which she is a scullery maid turning pirate queen to order the execution of her bosses and customers. The gang becomes nervous when the Chief of Police, Tiger Brown, arrives, but it's all part of the act; Brown had served with Mack in England's colonial wars and had intervened on numerous occasions to prevent the arrest of Macheath over the years. The old friends duet in the "Kanonen-Song" ("Cannon Song" or "Army Song"). In the next scene, Polly returns home and defiantly announces that she has married Macheath by singing the "Barbarasong" ("Barbara Song"). She stands fast against her parents' anger, but she inadvertently reveals Brown's connections to Macheath which they subsequently use to their advantage.

Act 2 
Polly warns Macheath that her father will try to have him arrested. He is finally convinced that Peachum has enough influence to do it and makes arrangements to leave London, explaining the details of his bandit "business" to Polly so she can manage it in his absence. Before he leaves town, he stops at his favorite brothel, where he sees his ex-lover, Jenny. They sing the "Zuhälterballade" ("Pimp's Ballad", one of the Villon songs translated by Ammer) about their days together, but Macheath doesn't know Mrs Peachum has bribed Jenny to turn him in. Despite Brown's apologies, there's nothing he can do, and Macheath is dragged away to jail. After he sings the "Ballade vom angenehmen Leben" ("Ballad of the Pleasant Life"), another Villon/Ammer song, another girlfriend, Lucy (Brown's daughter) and Polly show up at the same time, setting the stage for a nasty argument that builds to the "Eifersuchtsduett" ("Jealousy Duet"). After Polly leaves, Lucy engineers Macheath's escape. When Mr Peachum finds out, he confronts Brown and threatens him, telling him that he will unleash all of his beggars during Queen Victoria's coronation parade, ruining the ceremony and costing Brown his job.

Act 3 
Jenny comes to the Peachums' shop to demand her money for the betrayal of Macheath, which Mrs Peachum refuses to pay. Jenny reveals that Macheath is at Suky Tawdry's house. When Brown arrives, determined to arrest Peachum and the beggars, he is horrified to learn that the beggars are already in position and only Mr Peachum can stop them. To placate Peachum, Brown's only option is to arrest Macheath and have him executed. In the next scene, Macheath is back in jail and desperately trying to raise a sufficient bribe to get out again, even as the gallows are being assembled.

Soon it becomes clear that neither Polly nor the gang members can, or are willing to, raise any money, and Macheath prepares to die. He laments his fate and poses the 'Marxist' questions: "What's picking a lock compared to buying shares? What's breaking into a bank compared to founding one? What's murdering a man compared to employing one?" (These questions did not appear in the original version of the work, but first appeared in the musical Happy End, another Brecht/Weill/Hauptmann collaboration, in 1929 – they may in fact have been written not by Brecht, but by Hauptmann).

Macheath asks everyone for forgiveness ("Grave Inscription"). Then a sudden and intentionally comical reversal: Peachum announces that in this opera mercy will prevail over justice and that a messenger on horseback will arrive ("Walk to Gallows"); Brown arrives as that messenger and announces that Macheath has been pardoned by the queen and granted a title, a castle and a pension. The cast then sings the Finale, which ends with a plea that wrongdoing not be punished too harshly as life is harsh enough.

Musical numbers

Prelude 
1. Ouverture
2. Die Moritat von Mackie Messer ("The Ballad of Mack the Knife" – Street singer)

Act 1 
3. Morgenchoral des Peachum (Peachum's Morning Choral – Peachum, Mrs Peachum)
4. Anstatt dass-Song (Instead of Song – Peachum, Mrs Peachum)
5. Hochzeits-Lied (Wedding Song – Four Gangsters)
6. Seeräuberjenny (Pirate Jenny – Polly)
7. Kanonen-Song (Cannon Song – Macheath, Brown)
8. Liebeslied (Love Song – Polly, Macheath)
9. Barbarasong (Barbara Song – Polly)
10. I. Dreigroschenfinale (First Threepenny Finale – Polly, Peachum, Mrs Peachum)

Act 2 
11. Melodram (Melodrama – Macheath)
11a. Polly's Lied (Polly's Song – Polly)
12. Ballade von der sexuellen Hörigkeit (Ballad of Sexual Dependency – Mrs Peachum)
13. Zuhälterballade (Pimp's Ballad or Tango Ballad – Jenny, Macheath)
14. Ballade vom angenehmen Leben (Ballad of the Pleasant Life – Macheath)
15. Eifersuchtsduett (Jealousy Duet – Lucy, Polly)
15b. Arie der Lucy (Aria of Lucy – Lucy)
16. II. Dreigroschenfinale (Second Threepenny Finale – Macheath, Mrs Peachum, Chorus)

Act 3 
17. Lied von der Unzulänglichkeit menschlichen Strebens (Song of the Insufficiency of Human Struggling – Peachum)
17a. Reminiszenz (Reminiscence)
18. Salomonsong (Solomon Song – Jenny)
19. Ruf aus der Gruft (Call from the Grave – Macheath)
20. Grabschrift (Grave Inscription – Macheath)
20a. Gang zum Galgen (Walk to Gallows – Peachum)
21. III. Dreigroschenfinale (Third Threepenny Finale – Brown, Mrs Peachum, Peachum, Macheath, Polly, Chorus)

Reception

Opera or musical theatre? 
The ambivalent nature of The Threepenny Opera, derived from an 18th-century ballad opera but conceived in terms of 20th-century musical theatre, has led to discussion as to how it can best be characterised. According to critic and musicologist Hans Keller, the work is "the weightiest possible lowbrow opera for highbrows and the most full-blooded highbrow musical for lowbrows".

The Weill authority Stephen Hinton notes that "generic ambiguity is a key to the work’s enduring success", and points out the work's deliberate hybrid status: For Weill [The Threepenny Opera] was not just ‘the most consistent reaction to [Richard] Wagner’; it also marked a positive step towards an operatic reform. By explicitly and implicitly shunning the more earnest traditions of the opera house, Weill created a mixed form which incorporated spoken theatre and popular musical idioms. Parody of operatic convention – of Romantic lyricism and happy endings – constitutes a central device.

"Mack the Knife" 
The work's opening and closing lament, "Die Moritat von Mackie Messer", was written just before the Berlin premiere, when actor Harald Paulsen (Macheath) threatened to quit if his character did not receive an introduction; this creative emergency resulted in what would become the work's most popular song, later translated into English by Marc Blitzstein as "Mack the Knife", and now a jazz standard that Louis Armstrong, Bobby Darin, Ella Fitzgerald, Sonny Rollins, Frank Sinatra, Peggy Lee, Michael Bublé, Robbie Williams, Ray Quinn, and countless others have covered. In 2015 the Library of Congress added the recordings of "Mack the Knife" by Louis Armstrong and Bobby Darin to the National Recording Registry.

"Pirate Jenny" 
"Pirate Jenny" is another well-known song from the work, which has since been recorded by Nina Simone, Judy Collins, Tania Tsanaklidou, and Marc Almond, among others. In addition, Steeleye Span recorded it under the alternate title "The Black Freighter". Recently, the drag queen Sasha Velour has made an adaptation by the same name for an installment of One Dollar Drags, an anthology of short films.

"The Second Threepenny Finale" 
Under the title "What Keeps Mankind Alive?", this number has been recorded by the Pet Shop Boys on the B-side of their 1993 single "Can You Forgive Her?", and on two albums. Tom Waits covered it on two albums, and William S. Burroughs performed it in a 1994 documentary.

Revivals

Germany 
After World War II the first theater performance in Berlin was a rough production of The Threepenny Opera at the Theater am Schiffbauerdamm. Wolf Von Eckardt described the 1945 performance where audience members climbed over ruins and passed through a tunnel to reach the open-air auditorium deprived of its ceiling. In addition to the smell of dead bodies trapped beneath the rubble, Eckardt recollects the actors themselves were "haggard, starved, [and] in genuine rags. Many of the actors … had only just been released from concentration camp. They sang not well, but free."

France 
The Pabst film The Threepenny Opera was shown in its French version in 1931. In 1937 there was a production by Aufricht at the Théâtre de l'Étoile which failed, though Brecht himself had attended rehearsals. The work was not revived in France until after World War II.

United Kingdom 
In London, West End and Off-West End revivals include:
 Royal Court Theatre, 9 February to 20 March 1956 and Aldwych Theatre, from 21 March 1956. Directed by Sam Wanamaker. With Bill Owen as Macheath, Daphne Anderson as Polly.
 Prince of Wales Theatre and Piccadilly Theatre, opening 10 February 1972. With Vanessa Redgrave, Diana Quick and Barbara Windsor.
 National Theatre (Olivier Theatre), 13 March 1986. New translation by Robert David MacDonald, directed by Peter Wood. With Tim Curry as Macheath, Sally Dexter as Polly, and Joanna Foster as Lucy.
 Donmar Warehouse, 1994. Translation by Robert David MacDonald (book) and Jeremy Sams (lyrics). With Tom Hollander as Macheath and Sharon Small as Polly. This production released a cast recording as was nominated for Best Musical Revival and Best Supporting Performance in a Musical (for Tara Hugo as Jenny) at the 1995 Laurence Olivier Awards.
 National Theatre (Cottesloe Theatre) and UK Tour, February 2003. Translation by Jeremy Sams (lyrics) and Anthony Meech (book), directed by Tim Baker.
 National Theatre (Olivier Theatre), 18 May to 1 October 2016. New adaptation by Simon Stephens, directed by Rufus Norris. With Rory Kinnear as Macheath, Rosalie Craig as Polly, Nick Holder as Peachum, Haydn Gwynne as Mrs Peachum (nominated for Best Actress in a Supporting Role in a Musical at the 2017 Laurence Olivier Awards), Sharon Small as Jenny, Peter de Jersey as Brown. This production was broadcast live to cinemas worldwide through NT Live on 22 September.
In 2014, the Robert David MacDonald and Jeremy Sams translation (previously used in 1994 at the Donmar Warehouse) toured the UK, presented by the Graeae Theatre Company with Nottingham Playhouse, New Wolsey Theatre Ipswich, Birmingham Repertory Theatre and West Yorkshire Playhouse.

United States 
In 1946, four performances of the work were given at the University of Illinois in Urbana, and Northwestern University gave six performances in 1948 in Evanston, Illinois. In 1952, Leonard Bernstein conducted a concert performance of the work at the Brandeis University Creative Arts Festival in the Adolph Ullman Amphitheatre, Waltham, Massachusetts, to an audience of nearly 5,000. Marc Blitzstein, who translated the work, narrated.

At least five Broadway and Off-Broadway revivals have been mounted in New York City.
 In 1956, Lotte Lenya won a Tony Award for her role as Jenny, the only time an Off-Broadway performance has been so honored, in Blitzstein's somewhat softened version of The Threepenny Opera, which played Off-Broadway at the Theater de Lys in Greenwich Village for a total of 2,707 performances, beginning with an interrupted 96-performance run in 1954 and resuming in 1955. Blitzstein had translated the work into English, and toned down some of its acerbities. Over the course of its run, the production featured Scott Merrill as Macheath; Edward Asner as Mr. Peachum; Charlotte Rae (later Carole Cook, billed as “Mildred Cook,” then Jane Connell) as Mrs. Peachum; Jo Sullivan Loesser as Polly; Bea Arthur as Lucy; Jerry Orbach as PC Smith, the Street Singer and Mack; John Astin as Readymoney Matt/Matt of the Mint; and Jerry Stiller as Crookfinger Jake.
 A nine-month run in 1976–77 had a new translation by Ralph Manheim and John Willett for Joe Papp's New York Shakespeare Festival at the Vivian Beaumont Theater at Lincoln Center, directed by Richard Foreman, with Raul Julia as Macheath, Blair Brown as Lucy, and Ellen Greene as Jenny. The production rescinded some of Blitzstein's modifications. Critics were divided: Clive Barnes called it "the most interesting and original thing that Joe Papp ... has produced" whilst John Simon wrote "I cannot begin to list all the injuries done to Bertolt Brecht and Kurt Weill's masterpiece."
 A 1989 Broadway production, billed as 3 Penny Opera, translated by Michael Feingold, starred Sting as Macheath. Its cast also featured Georgia Brown as Mrs Peachum, Maureen McGovern as Polly, Kim Criswell as Lucy, KT Sullivan as Suky Tawdry and Ethyl Eichelberger as the Street Singer. The production was unsuccessful.
 Liberally adapted by playwright Wallace Shawn, the work was brought back to Broadway by the Roundabout Theatre Company at Studio 54 in March 2006 with Alan Cumming playing Macheath, Nellie McKay as Polly, Cyndi Lauper as Jenny, Jim Dale as Mr Peachum, Ana Gasteyer as Mrs Peachum, Carlos Leon as Filch, Adam Alexi-Malle as Jacob and Brian Charles Rooney as a male Lucy. Included in the cast were drag performers. The director was Scott Elliott, the choreographer Aszure Barton, and, while not adored by the critics, the production was nominated for the "Best Musical Revival" Tony award. Jim Dale was also Tony-nominated for Best Supporting Actor. The run ended on June 25, 2006.
 The Brooklyn Academy of Music presented a production directed by Robert Wilson and featuring the Berliner Ensemble for only a few performances in October 2011. The play was presented in German with English supertitles using the 1976 translation by John Willett. The cast included Stefan Kurt as Macheath, Stefanie Stappenbeck as Polly and Angela Winkler as Jenny. The Village Voice review said the production "turn[ed] Brecht and Weill's middle-class wake-up call into dead entertainment for rich people. His gelid staging and pallid, quasi-abstract recollections of Expressionist-era design suggested that the writers might have been trying to perpetrate an artsified remake of Kander and Ebb's Cabaret.

Regional productions include one at the Williamstown Theatre Festival, Massachusetts, in June and July 2003. Directed by Peter Hunt, the musical starred Jesse L. Martin as Mack, Melissa Errico as Polly, David Schramm as Peachum, Karen Ziemba as Lucy Brown and Betty Buckley as Jenny. The production received favorable reviews.

Film adaptations 
German director G. W. Pabst made a 1931 German- and French-language version simultaneously, a common practice in the early days of sound films.

Another version was directed by Wolfgang Staudte in West Germany in 1963, starring Curd Jürgens, Gert Fröbe, and Hildegard Knef. Scenes with Sammy Davis Jr. were added for its American release.

In 1989 an American version (renamed Mack the Knife) was released, directed by Menahem Golan, with Raul Julia as Macheath, Richard Harris as Peachum, Julie Walters as Mrs Peachum, Bill Nighy as Tiger Brown, Julia Migenes as Jenny, and Roger Daltrey as the Street Singer.

Radio adaptations 
In 2009, BBC Radio 3 in collaboration with the BBC Philharmonic broadcast a complete radio production of the Michael Feingold translation directed by Nadia Molinari with the music performed by the BBC Philharmonic. The cast included Joseph Millson as Macheath, Elen Rhys as Polly/Whore, Ruth Alexander-Rubin as Mrs Peachum/Whore, Zubin Varla as Mr. Peachum/Rev. Kimball, Rosalie Craig as Lucy/Whore, Ute Gfrerer as Jenny, Conrad Nelson as Tiger Brown and HK Gruber as the Ballad Singer.

Recordings 
Recordings are in German, unless otherwise specified.
 Die Dreigroschenoper, 1930, on Telefunken. Abridged/incomplete. Lotte Lenya (Jenny), Erika Helmke (Polly), Willy Trenk-Trebitsch (Macheath), Kurt Gerron (Moritatensänger; Brown), and Erich Ponto (Peachum).  Band, conducted by Theo Mackeben. Released on CD by Teldec Classics in 1990.
 The Threepenny Opera, 1954, on Decca Broadway 012–159–463–2. In English. Lyrics by Marc Blitzstein. The 1950s Broadway cast, starring Jo Sullivan (Polly Peachum), Lotte Lenya (Jenny), Charlotte Rae (Mrs Peachum), Scott Merrill (Macheath), Gerald Price (Street Singer), and Martin Wolfson (Peachum). Bea Arthur sings Lucy, normally a small role, here assigned an extra number. Complete recording of the score, without spoken dialogues. Conducted by Samuel Matlowsky.
 Die Dreigroschenoper, 1955, on Vanguard 8057, with Anny Felbermayer, Jenny Miller, Rosette Anday, Helge Rosvaenge, Alfred Jerger,  and Liane Augustin. Vienna State Opera Orchestra conducted by F. Charles Adler.
 Die Dreigroschenoper, 1958, on CBS MK 42637. Lenya, who also supervised the production, Johanna von Koczian, Trude Hesterberg, Erich Schellow, Wolfgang Neuss, and Willy Trenk-Trebitsch, Arndt Chorus, Sender Freies Berlin Orchestra, conducted by Wilhelm Brückner-Rüggeberg. Complete recording of the score, without spoken dialogues.
 Die Dreigroschenoper, 1966, conducted by Wolfgang Rennert on Philips. With Karin Hübner, Hans Korte, and Franz Kutschera.
 The Threepenny Opera, 1976, on Columbia PS 34326. Conducted by Stanley Silverman. In English, new translation by Ralph Manheim and John Willett. Starring the New York Shakespeare Festival cast, including Raul Julia (Macheath), Ellen Greene (Jenny), Caroline Kava (Polly), Blair Brown (Lucy), C. K. Alexander (Peachum) and Elizabeth Wilson (Mrs Peachum)
 Die Dreigroschenoper, 1968, on Polydor 00289 4428349 (2 CDs). Hannes Messemer (MM), Helmut Qualtinger (P), Berta Drews (MsP), Karin Baal (Polly), Martin Held (B), Hanne Wieder (J), Franz Josef Degenhardt (Mor). Conducted by James Last. The only recording, up to the present, that contains the complete spoken dialogue.
 Die Dreigroschenoper, 1988, on Decca 430 075. René Kollo (Macheath), Mario Adorf (Peachum), Helga Dernesch (Mrs Peachum), Ute Lemper (Polly), Milva (Jenny), Wolfgang Reichmann (Tiger Brown),  (Lucy),  (Herald). RIAS Berlin Sinfonietta, John Mauceri.
 Die Dreigroschenoper, 1990, on Koch International Classics 37006. Manfred Jung (Macheath), Stephanie Myszak (Polly), Anelia Shoumanova (Jenny), Herrmann Becht (Peachum), Anita Herrmann (Mrs Peachum), Eugene Demerdjiev (Brown), Waldemar Kmentt (Street Singer); Bulgarian Television and Radio Mixed Choir and Symphony Orchestra, Victor C. Symonette
 The Threepenny Opera, 1994, on CDJAY 1244. In English. Donmar Warehouse (London) production. Translated by Robert David Macdonald (lyrics translated by Jeremy Sams). Conducted by Gary Yershon. With Sharon Small (Polly Peachum), Tara Hugo (Jenny), Natasha Bain (Lucy Brown), Tom Hollander (Macheath), Simon Dormandy (Tiger Brown), Beverley Klein (Mrs Peachum) and Tom Mannion (Mr Peachum).
 Die Dreigroschenoper, 1997, on Capriccio. Conducted by Jan Latham-König, with Ulrike Steinsky, Gabriele Ramm, Jane Henschel, Rolf Wollrad, and Peter Nikolaus Kante.
 Die Dreigroschenoper, 1999, BMG 74321 66133–2, Ensemble Modern, HK Gruber (conductor, Mr Peachum), Max Raabe (Macheath), Sona MacDonald (Polly), Nina Hagen (Mrs Peachum), Timna Brauer (Jenny),  (Tiger Brown)

See also 

 Threepenny Novel (1934)
 Story adapted to Brazilian scenario by Chico Buarque, having Rio instead of London, as Ópera do Malandro (1979)
 The League of Extraordinary Gentlemen, Volume III: Century

Notes

References

Bibliography 
 Brockett, Oscar G. and Hildy, Franklin J., History of The Theatre, Allyn and Bacon, 2002 (9th Edition), 
 
 
 
 
 
 
 
 
 Warrack, John and West, Ewan (1992). The Oxford Dictionary of Opera. Oxford: Oxford University Press.

External links 

 
 
 The Threepenny Opera Website, historical information, audio files, quotes, and quizzes (requires Adobe Flash)
 Information on The Threepenny Opera English version, marc-blitzstein.org
 

1928 musicals
Plays by Bertolt Brecht
Broadway musicals
West End musicals
Operas by Kurt Weill
German-language operas
Operas
1928 operas
Ballad operas
Fiction set in 1838
Operas set in London
Plays based on other plays
German musicals
Tony Award-winning musicals
Musicals set in London